"Owaranai Christmas" is a song written by Shinji Harada.

Track listing

External links
Owaranai Christmas Official site 
Official Discography 
JBook data 

Akinori Nakagawa songs
2007 singles
2007 songs